Carry Somers (born 1966) is a British fashion designer, social entrepreneur and campaigner. She is founder of Fashion Revolution and was previously founder and director of Pachacuti.

Background 

Somers was born in Seaton, Devon in 1966 and attended Colyton Grammar School.   She has a degree in Languages and European Studies from Southampton University, and a Masters in Native American Studies Studies from the University of Essex which presented her with the alumnus of the year award in 2009. Somers set up fair trade fashion brand Pachacuti in 1992 and founded Fashion Revolution in 2013. In July 2022, Somers was awarded an honorary doctorate by Keele University.

Career

Fashion Revolution 

Somers is founder of Fashion Revolution, a global movement which arose from the Rana Plaza garment factory disaster in Bangladesh on 24 April 2013. Fashion Revolution is the world's largest fashion activism movement campaigning for systemic reform of the fashion industry with a focus on supply chain transparency.

Somers organised roundtable debates at the House of Commons and the House of Lords on ethics, sustainability and transparency in the fashion supply chain including Ethical Fashion 2020:a New Vision for Transparency  in June 2015 and Fashion Question Time annually from 2015 to 2018 in UK Parliament and in 2019 at the V&A. Somers speaks nationally  and internationally  about transparency, human rights and environmental issues in the fashion supply chain.

In 2020, Somers sailed 2000 miles from the Galapagos Islands to Easter Island and the South Pacific Gyre with eXXpedition, an all-female round-the-world sailing voyage carrying out scientific research into the impact of plastic and toxic pollution in the ocean.

In February 2022, Somers was nominated for a billboard campaign during New York Fashion Week highlighting women-led social enterprises in the fashion industry which are driving social and environmental impact, appearing on the Nasdaq billboard in Times Square and outside the United Nations.

Somers worked with garden designer Lottie Delamain on a Textile Garden for Fashion Revolution which won a silver gilt medal at the RHS Chelsea Flower Show in May 2022.

Pachacuti 
Somers founded fair trade hat brand Pachacuti in 1992.  Pachacuti was the first company to be verified under the World Fair Trade Organization Sustainable Fair Trade Management System,  the first International certification of a fair trade, sustainable production process. The WFTO Verification system guarantees practices, procedures and processes that demonstrate social, economic and environmental responsibility throughout the supply chain".  Pachacuti's products were labelled Verified Fair Trade by WFTO UK0001-2009 to 2012.

Pachacuti piloted the European Union Geo Fair Trade project from 2009–12 which traced products from the straw to the Panama hat weavers. 60 social, economic, geolocalisation and environmental indicators tracked annual changes.  The pilot project mapped the GPS co-ordinates of Pachacuti's 154 weavers' houses in Ecuador, the parcels of land where the Carludovica Palmata grows, and the co-ordinates of the associations who harvest and process the straw.

At London Fashion Week in September 2013, People Tree Ltd. and Pachacuti were the first companies in the world to launch the WFTO Fair Trade Guarantee System label.

Press 

Somers appears regularly on television and radio in the UK and overseas. She has been a regular guest on BBC World Business News, BBC Breakfast and national and international radio. Press articles and interviews include: Forbes How Two Entrepreneurs Became Unexpected Activists And Started A Fashion Revolution Telegraph She Wears It well El País Vogue, Newsweek How the Rana Plaza Disaster Changed Fashion Forever  and the Financial Times How to Spend It.

Lectures and Presentations 

Somers is a regular speaker at universities, events and conferences, both nationally  and internationally  on  Fashion Revolution, fair trade, entrepreneurship, sustainability and fashion. She has lectured on cruise ships in Latin America and the Caribbean on textiles, traditional dress, artisan handicrafts, indigenous peoples and fair trade.

Books 

Somers wrote the introduction to "Fixing Fashion" which looks at the impacts of consumer culture's addiction to disposable fashion, published in 2015 by New Society.
She is co-author of the book Working Ethically, which aims to help business owners find an ethical strategy which will benefit their suppliers, community and environment. She contributed to the book, published in 2014, "Sustainable Luxury and Social Entrepreneurship".

Business accomplishments 
 2022 Doctor of Letters honoris causa, Keele University, Staffordshire, UK in recognition of outstanding contribution to fair trade and leadership in advocacy for and recognition of sustainable practices in labour, trade and production in the global fashion industry. 
 2022 Honoree Conscious Fashion Campaign, New York 
 2020 Winner Luxury Sustainability Award at the Luxury Law Awards 
 2019 Named as one of 8 inspiring sustainable icons revolutionising fashion 
 2016 Named one of London's most influential people in the Equality Champions category of the Progress 1000 Awards, alongside David Beckham, Duchess of Cornwall, Duke and Duchess of Cambridge, Stephen Fry and Richard Gere.
2013 Winner of Outstanding Contribution to Sustainable Fashion at Source Awards, House of Lords
2011 Winner – Best Practice in Sustainable Luxury in Latin America,] Fashion & Accessories
2011 Winner –  Observer Ethical Award category 'Fashion & Accessories'
2011 Big Tick Award & 'Highly Commended' – Small Company of the Year category, National Awards for Excellence
2009 The University of Essex named Somers Alumnus of the Year 2009.
2008 Winner of The Hat Life Magazine  Hatty Award for significant contribution to the headwear industry.
2007 Invited to meet the Queen at Buckingham Palace on 14 February in "recognition of her significant contribution to UK business".
2007 Winner of the FSB British Small Business Champions Ethical Award;  interviewed on BBC Radio 4s Woman's Hour
2006 Winner of the award for the best growing business in the Country Living Enterprising Rural Women Award which recognises excellence in rural-based businesses.

See also 
Ethical consumerism
Social entrepreneur
Social enterprise

References

External links 
 
 Fashion Revolution
 Pachacuti

1966 births
Living people
Alumni of the University of Essex
People from Seaton, Devon
English businesspeople in fashion